Kristin Kuuba (born 15 February 1997) is an Estonian badminton player. She was a bronze medalist at the 2015 European Junior Championships in the girls' doubles event with her partner Helina Rüütel. Kuuba competed at the 2014 Nanjing Youth Olympics; 2015 Baku and 2019 Minsk European Games; and at the 2020 Tokyo Olympics.

Achievements

European Junior Championships 
Girls' doubles

BWF International Challenge/Series (11 titles, 7 runners-up) 
Women's singles

Women's doubles

  BWF International Challenge tournament
  BWF International Series tournament
  BWF Future Series tournament

References

External links 
 

1997 births
Living people
Sportspeople from Tartu
Estonian female badminton players
Badminton players at the 2014 Summer Youth Olympics
Badminton players at the 2015 European Games
Badminton players at the 2019 European Games
European Games competitors for Estonia
Badminton players at the 2020 Summer Olympics
Olympic badminton players of Estonia